Raju Jaywantrao Awale is a leader of Indian National Congress and a member of the Maharashtra Legislative Assembly elected from Hatkanangale Assembly constituency in Ichalkaranji, Kolhapur city.

Positions held
 2019: Elected to Maharashtra Legislative Assembly.
Vice-chairman: Kolhapur District Central Cooperative Bank (KDCC).

References

1974 births
Living people
Maharashtra MLAs 2019–2024
Indian National Congress politicians from Maharashtra
People from Kolhapur